Nikolay Valentinovich Korolyov (Russian: Николай Валентинович Королёв) (born 31 March, 1981 in Moscow) is a Russian radical nationalist, old believer, cossack, and leader of the neo-Nazi terrorist organization Spas (Russian: Спас). He was sentenced to life in prison for organizing and committing a number of particularly serious crimes.
Korolyov was one of several people originally suspected of orchestrating the explosion at Cherkizovsky market, including also Oleg Kostyrev, Ilya Tikhomirov, and Valery Zhukovtsov. According to the Moscow prosecutor's office, Korolyov had already been charged with the murder of two or more people on the grounds of ethnic, racial, and religious hatred.

References

See also 
2006 Moscow market bombing

1981 births
Russian nationalists
Russian neo-Nazis
Prisoners sentenced to life imprisonment by Russia
Russian prisoners sentenced to life imprisonment
Criminals from Moscow
Living people